Florida's 9th House District elects one member of the Florida House of Representatives. The district is represented by Allison Tant. The district is located in the Florida Panhandle, and encompasses part of the Big Bend. The district covers the western half of Leon County. The largest city in the district is Tallahassee, though this district only encompasses the downtown and northwestern portions of the city. As of the 2010 Census, the district's population is 158,781.

This district is covers most of downtown Tallahassee and the northern Tallahassee metropolitan area, giving it a large college and urban population. This has trended the district Democratic, with the last Republican to compete in the district losing in 2016 by 12%.

This district contains Florida State University, located in Tallahassee. The district also contains the Florida State Capitol.

Representatives from 1967 to the present

See also 

 Florida's 3rd Senate district
 Florida's 2nd congressional district
 Florida's 5th congressional district

References 

09
Leon County, Florida
Tallahassee, Florida